Tenchu Z is an action-adventure stealth video game developed by K2 LLC and published by FromSoftware in Japan and Microsoft Game Studios worldwide for the Xbox 360 in 2006.

It is different from previous games in the series in that the player creates their own ninja characters, then builds up their skills as they play through the game rather than choosing from a small selection of pre-made characters, as they take orders from the series' previous main male character, Rikimaru. It also features four-player cooperative play through Xbox Live.

Plot
The House of Gohda, where the Azuma Ninja Clan reside under the service of Lord Gohda, is on the brink of war with the neighboring country of Ogawara. As a new recruit in the Azuma Ninja Clan, the protagonist is sent to assassinate those who are assisting the country of Ogawara, including army generals and spies who have infiltrated the House of Gohda, as well as recover stolen items and rescue prisoners. In between thwarting the country of Ogawara's plans, the protagonist also receives missions in which he eliminates evil people such as abusive monks and greedy merchants.

There is no connection between Tenchu Z'''s plot and those in the previous games, nor are there any returning characters with the exceptions of Rikimaru and Lord Gohda.

GameplayTenchu Z is the largest game in the series to date, containing 50 missions with different difficulty settings and objectives. Characters also have different attributes (which are strength, agility, and health) which can be altered. Players use gold obtained by doing well in missions both in single player and multiplayer to purchase new aesthetic styles, abilities, items to use during missions, different special attacks to use in combat, in addition to combo-editing abilities.

Gameplay is relatively the same as the previous games in the series. The main difference is that, as mentioned above, players create their own character and unlock new skills, items and clothing for him as the game progresses. Only one fighting style is available: a Ninjato that can either be set with slower but more damaging attacks (the same as Rikimaru's in previous games) or faster and weaker attacks with different animations. The unlockable skills however are more varied, with most of them making their first appearance in the series while others return from previous games with some tweaks. Certain skills can be upgraded twice, enhancing the protagonist's abilities beyond those of the characters from previous games.

Enemies can hear footsteps if players run too close, and may hear them from a greater distance if they run on noisy surfaces such as puddles of water. They can also smell the protagonist if they fall into a cesspool (only found during some missions; after the protagonist emerges from the cesspool, a brown haze surrounds him, indicating that he can be detected by smell at a certain distance) or are covered with blood from an earlier fight. Lighting is also a factor, as the protagonist is less likely to be spotted while standing or crouching in a dark area.

ReceptionTenchu Z'' received "mixed or average" reviews, according to review aggregator Metacritic.

Notes

References

External links
Official website (From Software) 
Official website (Microsoft)

2006 video games
Action-adventure games
Cooperative video games
FromSoftware games
Tenchu games
Video game spin-offs
Video games developed in Japan
Video games featuring protagonists of selectable gender
Xbox 360-only games
Xbox 360 games
Multiplayer and single-player video games